A list of films produced by the Marathi language film industry based in Maharashtra in the year 1985.

1985 Releases
A list of Marathi films released in 1985.

References

Lists of 1985 films by country or language
 Marathi
1985